Asad Tajmmal Abdul-Khaliq (born August 4, 1980) is a former American football quarterback. He was the starting quarterback for the Minnesota Golden Gophers football team from 2000 to 2003. The Gophers went 10-3 during his senior year in 2003 with Abdul-Khaliq under center – the first time they won that many games in a season since a 10-1 season in 1905. He also briefly played for the Chicago Rush and the New York Dragons of the AFL.

College career 
Abdul-Khaliq was a four-year letter winner with Minnesota and was a two-year captain. He started as a freshman in 2000, although he eventually split quarterback duties during his freshman and sophomore years with junior-college transfer Travis Cole, with Cole seeing the majority of playing time. In 2002, after Cole graduated, Abdul-Khaliq became the full-time starter as a junior in 2002 and helped lead the Gophers to an 8-5 record, topped off by a win over Arkansas in the Music City Bowl. During his senior season, the Gophers got off to a 6-0 start and were nationally ranked before suffering a devastating comeback defeat at the hands of the Michigan Wolverines in a nationally televised game at the Hubert H. Humphrey Metrodome. The Gophers finished off the year 10-3, including a 31-30 victory over Oregon in the Sun Bowl. For the season Abdul-Khaliq passed for 2,401 yards, throwing for 17 touchdowns and scoring four more on the ground. Over his entire Gophers career, Abdul-Khaliq completed 481-of-847 career passes for 6,660 yards and 55 touchdowns in 46 games. He added 1,158 yards and 16 touchdowns rushing. Asad set Golden Gopher career records for touchdown passes (55), passing yards (6,600), total offense (7,818 yards), completions (481) and career touchdown-to-interception ratio (2.1-1). As of 2008, he currently holds all those records except for passing yards and completions which were broken by his successor Bryan Cupito, who also tied Abdul-Khaliq’s touchdown mark of 55. His 19 touchdown passes in 2002 were one shy of Mike Hohensee’s school record for touchdown passes in a season, and he tied Hohensee’s record of 10 straight games with at least one touchdown pass. He was the first quarterback in Gopher history to pass for at least 12 touchdowns in three seasons.

Professional career 
After leaving the University of Minnesota, Abdul-Khaliq signed a three-year contract with the Chicago Rush of the Arena Football League on November 1, 2004. He was Chicago’s third-string quarterback during his rookie year in 2005 but did not see any playing time. After playing in only two games for the Rush in 2006, Asad was traded to the New York Dragons. He did not start any games for New York in 2007, however he did play a little at defensive back, as the team finished the season 5-11 and failing to make the playoffs. He later caught on with the Fort Wayne Fusion in af2.

His cousin, professional football coach Todd Bowles,  was the head coach for the New York Jets from 2015 to 2018 and is currently the head coach of the Tampa Bay Buccaneers.

References 

1980 births
Living people
Elizabeth High School (New Jersey) alumni
Sportspeople from Elizabeth, New Jersey
Players of American football from New Jersey
American football quarterbacks
Minnesota Golden Gophers football players
Chicago Rush players
New York Dragons players
Fort Wayne Fusion players